The second inauguration of Joko Widodo as president of Indonesia took place on Sunday, 20 October 2019 at the DPR/MPR Building, Jakarta. This ceremony marked the commencement of the second consecutive and final five-year term of Joko Widodo (universally known as Jokowi) as president and first term of Ma'ruf Amin as vice president.

Jokowi-Amin ticket won the 2019 election with 55.5% of the popular vote against their only opponent, Prabowo Subianto-Sandiaga Uno. After Prabowo's dispute was rejected by the Constitutional Court, the General Elections Commission (KPU) declared the ticket as winners.

Inauguration ceremony 
The inauguration ceremony was started on 15:30 local time (08:30 UTC), 60 minutes later than scheduled. It was held as a People's Consultative Assembly (MPR) parliamentary session and was led by its speaker Bambang Soesatyo. As the inauguration was held in a Sunday, the assembly decided to push forward the session starting time, which usually held at 10:00 local time. The reasons were to give Christians and Buddhists to attend their respective religious service. It was also intended to not interrupt the weekly car free day held near the venue at the morning to noon with road closures; the car free day event was cancelled anyway.

Unlike the previous inauguration, cultural parades were not held. The event's security involved 31,000 personnel from the Indonesian National Police and the Indonesian National Armed Forces.

Guests

Indonesians
 Iriana, First Lady of Indonesia
 Mufidah Mi'ad Saad, Second Lady of Indonesia
 Wury Estu Handayani, Second Lady-designate of Indonesia
 Megawati Sukarnoputri, 5th President of Indonesia and 8th Vice President of Indonesia
 Susilo Bambang Yudhoyono, 6th President of Indonesia
 Hamzah Haz, 9th Vice President of Indonesia
 Boediono, 11th Vice President of Indonesia
 Hadi Tjahjanto, Commander of the Indonesian National Armed Forces
 Tito Karnavian, Chief of the Indonesian National Police
 Puan Maharani, Speaker of the DPR
 La Nyalla Mattalitti, Speaker of the DPD
 Anwar Usman, Chief Justice of the Constitutional Court of Indonesia
 Akbar Tanjung, 13th Speaker of the DPR
 Agung Laksono, 14th Speaker of the DPR
 Ginandjar Kartasasmita, 1st Speaker of the DPD
 Irman Gusman, 2nd Speaker of the DPD
 Oesman Sapta Odang, 4th Speaker of the DPD
 Anies Baswedan, Governor of Jakarta
 Basuki Tjahaja Purnama, former Governor of Jakarta
 Prabowo Subianto, losing presidential nominee of 2019 presidential election
 Sandiaga Uno, losing vice-presidential nominee of 2019 presidential election

Foreign dignitaries
1. Royalty leaders and the representatives
 Hassanal Bolkiah, Sultan of Brunei
 Mswati III, King of Eswatini
 Norihiro Nakayama, Deputy Minister of Foreign Affairs of Japan (as Emperor of Japan's Special Envoy)

2. Presidents, vice presidents, and the representatives
 Wang Qishan, Vice President and President of the People's Republic of China's Special Envoy
 Henry Van Thio, Second Vice-President of Myanmar
 Noh Young-min, Chief of Staff to the President of South Korea (as President of South Korea's Special Envoy)
 Teodoro Locsin Jr., Secretary of Foreign Affairs of the Philippines (as President of the Philippines' Special Envoy)
 Soewarto Moestadja,  (as President of Suriname's Special Envoy)
 Nahyan bin Mubarak Al Nahyan, Minister of State for Tolerance of United Arab Emirates (as President of the United Arab Emirates' Special Envoy).
 Elaine Chao, Secretary of Transportation of the United States (as U.S. president's Special Envoy)
 Đặng Thị Ngọc Thịnh, Vice President of Vietnam

3. Prime ministers and deputy prime ministers 
 Scott Morrison, Prime Minister of Australia
 Hun Sen, Prime Minister of Cambodia
 Saleumxay Kommasith, Foreign Minister of Laos (as President of Laos' Special Envoy)
 Mahathir Mohamad, Prime Minister of Malaysia
 Lee Hsien Loong, Prime Minister of Singapore
 Wissanu Krea-ngam, Deputy Prime Minister of Thailand

Morrison's appearance was the fourth consecutive by an Australian prime minister in an Indonesian presidential inauguration, which dates back to 2004, the year of Indonesia's first popularly-elected presidential election.

See also
 First inauguration of Joko Widodo

References

2010s in Jakarta
October 2019 events in Indonesia
Joko Widodo